Orlando College was a private, non-profit, non-sectarian, coeducational institution located in Orlando, Florida.  Founded in 1918 as Jones College, the school was chartered as a degree-granting institution by the State of Florida, and sought to provide higher education opportunities to the Central Florida region.  The college changed its name to Orlando College in 1982 and, after experiencing a decade of growth, closed and was sold to Corinthian Colleges, Inc. (CCi) in 1995.

Environment
Praised for its sometimes non-traditional educational techniques, classes at the college were relatively small, often holding as few as seven students and no more than twenty-five.  This was a reflection of the school's guiding philosophy that all students should have as intimate a relationship with one another as the material they were studying.  The school's recruitment materials often carried the tagline, "A small college can make a big difference" as a reflection of its philosophy toward education.

Campus 
The Orlando College campus was located on Diplomat Circle, north of Lee Road and was visible from Interstate 4.  After the school's closure, part of the physical plant was sold off and, after years of neglect, became a shopping center in 2001.  The buildings that remain are now part of Florida Metropolitan University.

The Orlando College campus consisted of academic and administration buildings.  Cafeterias were available in the Diplomat Building.  (In addition to its main campus, a small building that acted as an extension of the school's medical program was added, adjacent to Orlando Regional Medical Center, in 1987.)  The school offered no student housing and was considered a "commuter college" though many nearby apartment complexes became unofficial "dormitories" for Orlando College students.

Curriculum 
The college offered undergraduate degrees (associate and bachelor) starting with its accreditation in 1953.  In 1987, the college expanded its curriculum to offer graduate degrees.  In addition to offering master's degrees, Accounting majors were able to finish their required fifth year of study at the college, in order to qualify for the Florida State Board of Accountancy Examination.

Areas of study for associate and bachelor's degrees included Business, Art, Medicine, Film Studies, and Legal. Partner program with Stetson University. Master's degrees were available in Business Administration and Public Administration.

Confusion 
In 1980, a controversy that hung over the college for its remaining years began when a small college operating under the name Orlando Christian College, located on Marks Street in the Lake Highland neighborhood, lost its accreditation and was forced to close.  The campus of Orlando Christian College later became that of Lake Highland Preparatory School (which has no relation to the defunct Orlando Christian College).  This closure resulted in a misperception among the public that Orlando College was granting degrees while lacking accreditation.  This resulted in annual statements from the school to students and the press, reassuring all that the school was fully accredited by parties of the United States Office of Education, the Council on Postsecondary Accreditation, and licensed by the Florida State Licensure Board of Independent Colleges and Universities.

Closure 
In 1995, the college was sold from the founding Jones family to CCi, at which time the college's focus and curriculum underwent a thorough redesign to make the institution a business school focused on career training.  In 1995, the school was renamed Florida Metropolitan University and was merged with other existing for-profit career colleges throughout the state, all carrying the same Florida Metropolitan University brand.  The name Orlando College has not been used by any university or college since.

Notes

Universities and colleges in Orlando, Florida
Corinthian Colleges
Educational institutions established in 1918
1918 establishments in Florida
Private universities and colleges in Florida